Liga Deportiva Universitaria de Quito's 1974 season was the club's 44th year of existence, the 21st year in professional football, the 1st in the Serie B and the 14th in the top level of professional football in Ecuador.

Squad

Competitions

Serie B

First stage

Results

Serie A

Second stage

Results

Semifinals

Results

Finals

Results

External links

RSSSF 

1974